Gallaicolichen is a genus of fungi in the Ascomycota phylum. The relationship of this taxon to other taxa within the phylum is unknown (incertae sedis), and it has not yet been placed with certainty into any class, order, or family. This is a monotypic genus, containing the single species Gallaicolichen pacificus.

The genus name of Gallaicolichen is in honour of David John Galloway (1942 – 2014), who was a biochemist, botanist, and lichenologist.

The genus was circumscribed by Emmannuël Sérusiaux and Robert Lücking in Biblioth. Lichenol. Vol.95 on page 510 in 2007.

See also
 List of Ascomycota genera incertae sedis

References

External links
Index Fungorum

Ascomycota enigmatic taxa
Monotypic Ascomycota genera
Taxa named by Emmanuël Sérusiaux
Taxa named by Robert Lücking